The 1977 UK Championship was a professional non-ranking snooker tournament that took place at the Tower Circus in Blackpool between 26 November and 3 December 1977.

Mike Watterson instituted this new championship with sponsorship from manufacturers of the Super Crystalate balls. The inaugural UK Championship was held in Blackpool, but the following year the tournament moved to the Guild Hall in Preston, where it remained for twenty years.

The event was won by Patsy Fagan, a London-based Dubliner, who had been a professional for less than a year. The final was televised and shown on BBC One's Grandstand programme. Retired English snooker player Joe Davis presented Fagan with the trophy.

Fagan earned £2,000 out of the £7,000 total prize money.

Main draw

Final

Century breaks

 129  Alex Higgins

References

External links
Last Frame of the final and trophy presentation (YouTube)

1977
UK Championship
UK Championship
UK Championship
UK Championship